McAdams or MacAdams is a surname of Scottish origin. It may refer to:
 Ben McAdams (b. 1974), Utah state senator (2009-2013), Mayor of Salt Lake County, Utah (2013-2019), U.S. Representative (2019-)
 Billy McAdams (1939–2002), Northern-Irish footballer
 Carl McAdams (b. 1944), American professional football player
 Dan P. McAdams (b. 1954), American professor of psychology
 Dean McAdams (1917–1996), American football player
 Dona Ann McAdams (b. 1954), American photographer
 Francis H. McAdams (1915–1985), American member of the National Transportation Safety Board (NTSB)
 Janet McAdams (b. 1957), American author of partial Native American descent
 John McAdams (announcer) (1941–2005), American sports announcer
 John C. McAdams (1945–2021), American political scientist
 Lewis MacAdams (1943-2020), American poet, journalist, activist, and filmmaker
 Rachel McAdams (b. 1978), Canadian actress
 Roberta MacAdams (1880–1959), Canadian politician from Alberta
 Scott McAdams (born 1970), Mayor of Sitka, Alaska and Democratic nominee for United States Senator from Alaska in 2010
Places
 McAdams Lake, Nova Scotia, Canada

References

Patronymic surnames
Surnames of Scottish origin
Surnames from given names